Pat Connolly is the name of:

Pat Connolly (musician), American musician with The Surfaris
Pat Connolly (footballer) (born 1941), English footballer
Pat Connolly (announcer) (1928–2012), Canadian sports broadcaster
Pat Daniels (married name Connolly, born 1943), track and field coach

See also
Paddy Connolly (born 1970), Scottish former footballer 
Patrick Connolly (1920s–2016), former Attorney General of Ireland
Patrick Connolly (footballer, born 1901) (1901–1969), Scottish footballer 
Connolly (surname)